Pulin Das (1 November 1918 – 16 July 2014) was an Indian first-class cricketer. He played two matches for Assam between 1949 and 1952. He was a right-handed batsman. He was a pioneer organizer of sport events and a veteran sport journalist in India. He was also the founding secretary of Assam Cricket Association. He was the last living member of Assam's first Ranji Cricket Team in 1948.

Career
He was a regular tennis player until his death with fellow members of the India Club and commonly known as a strong man because of his physical well-being. Apart from being a cricketer, he was a table tennis, hockey and tennis player. He was part of founding new sport organizations. Das was closely associated regarding construction of the Nehru Stadium in India.

In 1949, Das joined the first class Assam cricket team. He was later resigned from team in 1952 and continued his works in the Assam Cricket Association.

Awards
 ACA Lifetime Achievement Award: 2013

References

External links
 

1918 births
2014 deaths
Indian cricketers
Assam cricketers
Cricketers from Guwahati